The Valchid is a left tributary of the river Târnava Mare in Romania. It flows into the Târnava Mare near Dumbrăveni.

References

Rivers of Romania
Rivers of Sibiu County